Reginald P. Morelli (December 10, 1935 – November 11, 2020) was a Canadian ice hockey center who was the Most Outstanding Player of the 1959 NCAA Tournament.

Career
Morelli was a scorer for North Dakota from the moment he joined the varsity squad in 1957. As a sophomore he produced a more than point-per-game pace and helped the Fighting Sioux win their first WIHL championship (tied) and make their first NCAA tournament bid. The team throttled Harvard in the semifinal but couldn't overcome Denver in the final and finished as the runners-up in 1958.

While the WIHL collapsed that summer, UND continued to play well and received their second bid in 1959 on the strength of an 18–10–1 record and having defeated Denver in the season series. The Fighting Sioux escaped an ignominious fate with an overtime win over St. Lawrence in the semifinal, then turned their attention to Michigan State in the final. The Spartans scored first but a 3-goal outburst from the Sioux put the team firmly in the lead. Morelli assisted on the goal that got the ball rolling and with just 20 minutes left it looked like the Sioux had things well in hand. MSU, however, had other ideas; the Spartans returned the favor in the third, scoring twice to tie the game and send the championship match into overtime for only the second time in history. Just over four minutes into the extra frame, UND got its first shot on goal, and it was the only one they needed as Morelli sent the puck past a sprawled Joe Selinger and the team won the NCAA Championship. Morelli was named as the Most Outstanding Player and made the All-Tournament First Team.

As a senior, Morelli's scored 34 goals and 65 points in 31 games, setting a program record for points that would stand until 1979. He was named to both the All-WCHA First Team and AHCA All-American West Team.

Morelli continued to play hockey for several years after graduating, winning the Turner Cup as a member of the St. Paul Saints in 1961. He was inducted into the UND Athletic Hall of Fame in 1977, and got to see both his son Matt and grandson Mason play collegiate ice hockey. He died on November 11, 2020 at the age of 84.

Statistics

Regular season and playoffs

Awards and honors

References

External links

1935 births
2020 deaths
Canadian ice hockey centres
Ice hockey people from Ontario
Sportspeople from Hamilton, Ontario
North Dakota Fighting Hawks men's ice hockey players
St. Paul Saints (IHL) players
Warroad Lakers players
NCAA men's ice hockey national champions
AHCA Division I men's ice hockey All-Americans